Thimmanayakanpalayam also known as T.N. Palayam is a panchayat village in Ariyankuppam Commune in the Union Territory of Puducherry.  It is also a revenue village under Ariyankuppam Firka

Geography
Thimmanayakanpalayam is bordered by Abishegapakkam in the north, rest of all directions is bordered by Malaattar River.

Demographics
Thimmanayakanpalayam has an average literacy rate of 81.49%, male literacy is 88.89%, and female literacy is 74.13%. In Thimmanayakanpalayam, 10% of the population is under 6 years of age.

Transport
Thimmanayakanpalayam is located at 3.1 km from Abishegapakkam on Abishegapakkam - TN Palayam Road. Abishegapakkam can be reached by any bus between Pondicherry and  Bahoor, Madukarai and Karaiyanputtur running via Ariyankuppam.  From Abishegapakkam, one has to walk 3.1 km to reach Thimmanayakanpalayam.  Thimmanayakanpalayam can also be reached directly by PRTC Bus (Route No. 5A) running between Pondicherry and Thimmanayakanpalayam but the frequency is very less.

Road Network
Thimmanayakanpalayam is connected to Pondicherry by RC-20 State Highway and in turn by Abishegapakkam–Thimmanayakanpalayam Road.  There is another road from TN Palayam to Bahour  via Mel Azhingipattu and Seliamedu

Tourism

Singirikudi Lakshminarashimhar Koil
Singirikudi Lakshminarashimhar Koil is located at 3.3 km from Thimmanayakanpalayam. Singirikudi is famous for the Ugira Narashimhar.

Rural Tourism
TN palayam village is declared for rural tourism in Puducherry. The other village considered for rural tourism is Alangkuppam village

Politics
Thimmanayakanpalayam is a part of Manavely (State Assembly Constituency) which comes under Puducherry (Lok Sabha constituency)

References

External links
 Official website of the Government of the Union Territory of Puducherry

Villages in Puducherry district
Ariyankuppam